My Brilliant Career is a 1901 novel written by Miles Franklin. It is the first of many novels by Stella Maria Sarah Miles Franklin (1879–1954), one of the major Australian writers of her time. It was written while she was still a teenager, as a romance to amuse her friends. Franklin submitted the manuscript to Henry Lawson who contributed a preface and took it to his own publishers in Edinburgh. The popularity of the novel in Australia and the perceived closeness of many of the characters to her own family and circumstances as small farmers in New South Wales near Goulburn caused Franklin a great deal of distress and led her to withdrawing the novel from publication until after her death.

Shortly after the publication of My Brilliant Career, Franklin wrote a sequel, My Career Goes Bung, which would not be published until 1946.

Plot summary
The heroine, Sybylla Melvyn, is an imaginative, headstrong girl growing up in rural Australia in the 1890s. Drought and a series of poor business decisions reduce her family to subsistence level, her father begins to drink excessively, and Sybylla struggles to deal with the monotony of her life. To her relief, she is sent to live on her grandmother's property, where life is more comfortable. There she meets wealthy young Harold Beecham, who loves her and proposes marriage; convinced of her ugliness and aware of her tomboyish ways, Sybylla is unable to believe that he could really love her. 
By this time, her father's drinking has plunged the family into debt, and she is sent to work as governess/housekeeper for the family of an almost illiterate neighbor to whom her father owes money. She finds life there unbearable and eventually suffers a physical breakdown which leads to her return to the family home. When Harold Beecham returns to ask Sybylla to marry him, she concludes that she would only make him unhappy and sends him away, determined never to marry. The novel ends with no suggestion that she will ever have the "brilliant career" as a writer that she desires.

Film, TV or theatrical adaptations

A 1979 film version, produced by Margaret Fink and directed by Gillian Armstrong, features Judy Davis and Sam Neill in starring roles as Sybylla and Harry.

Release details
 1901, Australia, William Blackwood & Sons (ISBN NA), Pub date ? ? 1901, hardback (First edition)
 1980, UK, Virago Press, Pub date July 14, 1980, paperback

References

External links

 
 
 
 Introduction to a new edition published in The Sydney Morning Herald

1901 Australian novels
Australian novels adapted into films
Novels by Miles Franklin
Novels set in New South Wales
Novels set in the 19th century
Roman à clef novels
William Blackwood books
1901 debut novels

fr:Ma brillante carrière